Dorset House School is a co-educational preparatory school near Pulborough in West Sussex, England. There are 146 pupils, made up of 81 boys and 65 girls, whose ages range from 4yrs to 13yrs.

History
The school was founded in 1784 as Totteridge Park School in Hertfordshire. In 1865 it moved to Hendon and became Brent Bridge House school, and from 1874 to 1886, it move to Elstree and became Hillside School. In 1886 it moved to Littlehampton and became The School House, and in 1905, it merged with and became Dorset House School.

External links
School website
Dorset House School, isbi.com website

References

Preparatory schools in West Sussex
Educational institutions established in 1784
1784 establishments in England